Tiruppattur was a Lok Sabha constituency in Tamil Nadu. After delimitation in 2009, it is now a defunct constituency.

Assembly segments
Tiruppattur Lok Sabha constituency is composed of the following assembly segments:
Vaniyambadi (moved to Vellore constituency after 2009)
Natrampalli (defunct)
Tiruppattur (moved to Tiruvannamalai constituency after 2009)
Chengam (SC) (moved to Tiruvannamalai constituency after 2009)
Thandarambattu  (defunct)
Kalasapakkam (moved to Tiruvannamalai constituency after 2009)

Members of Parliament

Election results

General Election 2004

General Election 1999

General Election 1998

General Election 1996

General Election 1991

General Election 1989

General Election 1984

General Election 1980

General Election 1977

General Election 1971

See also
 Tirupattur
 List of Constituencies of the Lok Sabha

References

External links
 Election Commission of India -http://www.eci.gov.in/StatisticalReports/ElectionStatistics.asp

Former constituencies of the Lok Sabha
Former Lok Sabha constituencies of Tamil Nadu